ICI-164384, also known as N-n-butyl-N-methyl-11-(3,17β-dihydroxyestra-1,3,5(10)-trien-7α-yl)undecanamide, is a steroidal antiestrogen and a synthetic derivative of estradiol which is closely related to fulvestrant and was never marketed. It is a silent antagonist of the estrogen receptor (ER) with no intrinsic estrogenic activity and hence is a pure antiestrogen, unlike selective estrogen receptor modulators (SERMs) like tamoxifen. The drug was under development by AstraZeneca for the treatment of breast cancer but was discontinued in favor of fulvestrant, which is very similar to ICI-164384 but is more potent in comparison.

See also
 Cytestrol acetate
 Ethamoxytriphetol
 TAS-108

References

External links
 ICI-164384 - AdisInsight

Antiestrogens
AstraZeneca brands
Carboxamides
Diols
Estranes
Hormonal antineoplastic drugs